Žehušice is a market town in Kutná Hora District in the Central Bohemian Region of the Czech Republic. It has about 800 inhabitants.

Administrative parts
The village of Bojmany is an administrative part of Žehušice.

Geography
It lies in a flat agricultural landscape of the Central Elbe Table. The market town is situated on the left bank of the Doubrava River, at the confluence of the Doubrava and Brslenka rivers.

History
The first written mention of Žehušice is from 1350. The village was promoted to a market town in 1540 by Emperor Ferdinand I, but it lost this title in 1601. From 1661 to 1918, Žehušice was owned by the Thun und Hohenstein family. In 1865, Žehušice was once again promoted to a martket town.

Sights
Žehušice is known for the Deer Park Žehušice. It is a  large deer park, founded by the Thun und Hohenstein family in 1867. Among other animals, a rare herd of white stags is kept in it. Today it is protected as a nature monument. The deer park is privately owned and is closed to the public. The landscape around Žehušice, including the deer park and the castle park of the nearby Kačina castle, is protected as a landscape monument zone, because it is a uniquely preserved document of Baroque urbanism and a Baroque composed landscape.

The Žehušice Castle is located next to the deer park. It is an early Baroque castle whose construction was completed in 1679. In 1826, it was rebuilt in the Empire style. A castle park is adjacent to the castle.

A notable building is the former Renaissance fortress, also called Old Castle. In addition to its historical value, it is known as the birthplace of Giovanni Punto. Today the building is dilapidated and unused.

The Church of Saint Mark belongs to the main landmarks of Žehušice. It was built in the Baroque style in 1760. Next to the church is an atypical separate bell tower, built in the Moorish style.

Notable people
Giovanni Punto (1746–1803), horn player

Gallery

References

External links

Market towns in the Czech Republic
Populated places in Kutná Hora District